James Howden (25 August 1900 – 12 March 1978) was a New Zealand rugby union player. A hooker, Howden represented  in 12 games at a provincial level between 1926 and 1928. He played just one match for the New Zealand national side, the All Blacks, against a combined West Coast-Buller side at Greymouth in 1928. He did not appear in any Test matches.

References

1900 births
1978 deaths
Rugby union players from Glasgow
Scottish emigrants to New Zealand
New Zealand rugby union players
New Zealand international rugby union players
Southland rugby union players
Rugby union hookers